Michael Joseph Reagan (born 1954) is a former United States district judge of the United States District Court for the Southern District of Illinois.

Education and career

Born in Albuquerque, New Mexico, Reagan received a Bachelor of Science degree from Bradley University in 1976 and a Juris Doctor from St. Louis University School of Law in 1980. He was a law clerk in the Office of the Appellate Defender for the Fifth Appellate District of Illinois in 1978. He was in private practice from 1979 to 2000, also working as an instructor in business law, Belleville Area College from 1980–83 and as an adjunct assistant professor of law at St. Louis University from 1982-88. He was an assistant public defender for St. Clair County, Illinois from 1996 to 2000.

Federal judicial service
On May 11, 2000, Reagan was nominated by President Bill Clinton to a new seat on the United States District Court for the Southern District of Illinois new seat created on November 2, 2002 by 116 Stat. 1758. Reagan was confirmed by the United States Senate on October 3, 2000, and received his commission on October 13, 2000. He was designated Chief Judge on October 1, 2014. He retired from active service on March 31, 2019.

References

Notes

Sources

1954 births
Living people
Bradley University alumni
Judges of the United States District Court for the Southern District of Illinois
Illinois lawyers
People from Albuquerque, New Mexico
Public defenders
Saint Louis University alumni
United States district court judges appointed by Bill Clinton
Date of birth missing (living people)
20th-century American judges
21st-century American judges